Kinshasa palace  is a 2006 film.

Synopsis
A man about whom we know very little searches for his brother who disappeared after leaving his children at the station. As he traces his steps through Paris, Kinshasa, Brussels, Lisbon and Cambodia, childhood memories flood back. Little by little, he metamorphoses until it's difficult to tell him apart from his missing brother.

Awards
 Quintessence Ouidah (Benín)

References

External links
 
 

2007 films
Creative Commons-licensed films
Democratic Republic of the Congo documentary films